Dobashi (written: 土橋) is a Japanese surname. Notable people with the surname include:

, Japanese footballer
, Japanese baseball player
, Japanese baseball player and manager
Myron N. Dobashi (born 1943), United States Air Force general
, Japanese boxer

See also
Dobashi Station (disambiguation), multiple railway stations in Japan
Dobhashi, Persianised register of the Bengali language
 

Japanese-language surnames